Jamie Kime is an American guitarist who has worked with Michelle Branch, Jewel, and as a member of the Zappa Plays Zappa world tour.

Kime attended the Musicians Institute in Hollywood, California, training under guitarists such as Peter Sprague and Ted Greene. He then began a performance and recording career that culminated in his rhythm guitar duties on the Zappa Plays Zappa tour.  Concert reviewers have noted Kime's positive addition to songs on the tour. As a member of the Zappa Plays Zappa ensemble, Kime won a 2009 Best Rock Instrumental Performance Grammy Award for the group's recording of "Peaches en Regalia".

References 

Living people
American rock guitarists
American male guitarists
Year of birth missing (living people)
Zappa Plays Zappa members